Glamazon, a portmanteau of glamorous and Amazon, may refer to:

Glamazon (album), an album by singer–drag queen RuPaul
"Glamazon" (song), its title song
Beth Phoenix (born 1980), professional wrestler formerly known as "The Glamazon"